Krishnarao Patil is a Nationalist Congress party politician from Mudal, Bhudargad Tehsil, Kolhapur district, Maharashtra. He is firstly elected as member of Legislative Assembly in 2004 as independence against Bajarang Desai, Indian National Congress Party former member of Legislative Assembly. He continued the Legislative Assembly till 2009 for 10 years as firstly elected member in the Radhanagari Constituency.

He is chairman of Dudhganga Vedganga Cooperative Sugar Factory Ltd., Bidri, Kagal. He upgraded factory with 20 MW of electricity Production Plant.

He is defeated in 2014 and 2019 candidate of Legislative Assembly from Radhanagari Vidhan Sabha constituency of Kolhapur, Maharashtra, India as a member of Nationalist Congress Party by Shivsena candidate Prakash Aabitkar.

References

Year of birth missing (living people)
Living people
People from Kolhapur district
Shivaji University alumni
Indian National Congress politicians from Maharashtra
Maharashtra MLAs 2004–2009
Maharashtra MLAs 2009–2014
Date of birth missing (living people)
Nationalist Congress Party politicians